The Santiago Mariño Polytechnic University Institute (Spanish: Instituto Universitario Politécnico "Santiago Mariño", IUPSM) is a private university located in Barcelona, Venezuela. It belongs to a network of Higher education universities called "Educational Complex "Antonio José de Sucre". 

This Institute offers its students services. It also counts with a large number of chemical, electrical and computer laboratories.

History 
The institution was created on September 17, 1991, by Dr. Raúl Quero Silva in Barcelona and it started its functions as a university by the presidential decree Nº 1.893. The academic activities started for the first time in October, 1991 with Architecture and Engineering classes. In the year 1993, the institution expanded its coverage and educational offer by creating extensions in different cities.

See also 
 List of universities in Venezuela
 Santiago Mariño

References 

Universities in Venezuela
Buildings and structures in Anzoátegui
Buildings and structures in Monagas